Australian National Line (ANL) was a coastal shipping line established in by the Government of Australia in 1956. It was sold in 1998 by the Howard government to CMA CGM.

History

Australian National Line was formed on 1 October 1956 as the Australian Coastal Shipping Commission with the passing of the Australian Coastal Shipping Commission Act. The organisation took about forty ships previously operated by the Australian Shipping Board, which had been formed in 1946 by the Australian Federal Government.

In March 1969, ANL commenced operating services to Japan in a joint venture with K Line.

In 1974, the Australian Coastal Shipping Commission was renamed the Australian Shipping Commission in recognition of its international role, it continued to trade as ANL. In 1989 Australian National Line was established as a wholly owned government company. In 1998 the French company CMA CGM bought the naming rights of ANL Limited from the Australian Federal Government.

The Australian National Line was an early member of the Australian Shipping and Defence Council (now the Australian Maritime Defence Council) which was established by the Government of Australia in 1982.

Services

Historical
The company entered the ferry business in 1959, when Tasmanian Steamers announced that it would be withdrawing from the Bass Strait. Its ship the Taroona was becoming totally inadequate, only being able to carry 30 cars, which had to be lifted aboard. As no replacement was available, the Federal Government decided that the Australian National Line should take over, and it would be provided with a subsidy with an order placed with the State Dockyard, Newcastle. The new ship was named Princess of Tasmania, was the first roll on/roll off ferry in the southern hemisphere and the largest. She entered the Melbourne — Devonport route on 23 September 1959. The new ship and route were such a success for the ANL ordered a cargo only ship, to be named Bass Trader .
 
With the passenger numbers going so well on the Princess of Tasmania and cargo going very well also, ANL decided that a regular passenger service from Sydney to Hobart should be re-established. An order was placed with Cockatoo Docks & Engineering Company. The new ship was christened Empress of Australia on 18 January 1964. Empress of Australia made her maiden voyage from Sydney to Hobart on 16 January 1965. The Empress of Australia operated from Sydney to Hobart and Sydney to Bell Bay/Burnie and back .
 
With the Princess of Tasmania going so well out of Melbourne, there needed to be more capacity on the route, so ANL ordered a new ship to be built at the State Dockyard. The new ship would be bigger, with smaller passenger capacity but more cargo space, an early example of the Ro/Pax concept. The new ship was launched on 17 February 1969 as the Australian Trader. On 24 June 1969, Australian Trader set out on her maiden voyage to Devonport. The new ship operated a rotation between Bell Bay, Devonport and Burnie .
 
On 27 June 1972 Princess of Tasmania left Devonport for the final time. ANL sold her to Bahamarine, Nassau and she left Australia on 7 October 1972. When the Princess of Tasmania left the route the Australian Trader swapped with her, and Empress of Australia replaced the Princess of Tasmania on the Melbourne — Devonport trade.

ANL were involved in the 1975 Tasman Bridge disaster in Hobart, Tasmania, as the owner/operator of the Lake Illawarra, the bulk carrier which collided with the bridge, and consequently sank.

ANL announced that Australian Trader would be withdrawn from service, being replaced by a new freight only ship named Bass Trader.

On the final arrival of the Australian Trader in Bell Bay the crew went on strike. The ship remained idle there for two months. Finally on 24 September 1976 they gave up and she sailed to Sydney, laid-up and was offered for sale. The sale was completed on 16 January 1977 to the Royal Australian Navy as a training ship.

In 1983 the Tasmanian government were seeking from the Federal Government funds to charter a supplementary ship, being either Scotia Prince, St Patrick II, Stena Baltica or Odysseus Elytis. This was rejected.

In 1984 ANL announced that it would not be continuing in the ferry business, and the Empress of Australia would be withdrawn in 1985 and sold. This was then put into the hands of the Tasmanian Government which subsequently formed the TT-Line with the Federal Government agreeing to buy a ship.

The ceasing of the ANL's involvement in the passenger trade allowed it to concentrate solely on bulk freight and cargo. In December 1998, CMA CGM bought ANL's container shipping business and trading name from the Federal Government.

Commercially, ANL still operates the more traditional north–south directional trades, plus nearly 20 relatively new east–west directional trades riding on the services of its parent — CMA CGM.

Fleet summary
This is a list of ships owned or operated by ANL between its formation in 1956 and privatisation in 1998.
{| class="wikitable sortable"
|- 
! Name !! Type !! Entered ANL service !! Left ANL service !! Disposition !! Fate
|-
| Baralga|| General cargo ||  ||  || Sold to Nilmore || Scrapped 1980
|-
| Bilkurra|| General cargo ||  ||  || Sold to Malaysian International Shipping || Scrapped 1974
|-
| Binburra|| General cargo ||  ||  || Sold to Malaysian International Shipping || Scrapped 1974
|-
| Boonaroo || General cargo ||  ||  || Sold to Collin Navigation Co || Scrapped 1985
|-
| Bulwarra|| General cargo ||  ||  || Sold to Collin Navigation Co || Ran aground off Keelung and broke apart on 22 October 1971, total loss
|-
| Dalby|| General cargo ||  ||  || Sold to Cronulla Cia Nav || Ran aground off Keelung on 14 November 1971, abandoned as total loss
|-
| Dandenong|| General cargo ||  ||  || Sold to Jones Brothers Coal || Scrapped 1971
|-
| Daylesford|| General cargo ||  ||  || Sold to Fung Shing Navigation Co || Scrapped 1972
|-
| Delungra|| General cargo ||  ||  || Sold to H & S Credits || Scrapped 1974
|-
| Denman|| General cargo ||  ||  || Sold to Eddie Steamships (Philippines) || Scrapped 1970
|-
| Dubbo|| General cargo ||  ||  || Sold to Australia Pacific Co (Hong Kong) || Scrapped 1969
|-
| Edenhope|| General cargo ||  ||  || Sold to Bougainville Trading Co || Scrapped 1979
|-
| Elmore|| General cargo ||  ||  || Sold to John Burke || Scrapped 1987
|-
| Enfield|| General cargo ||  ||  || Sold to Legaspi Oil Co || Deregistered 2008 in Manila, Philippines. Still afloat.
|-
| Eugowra|| General cargo ||  ||  || Sold to Pacific Islands Shipping Co || Scrapped 1974
|-
| Euroa|| General cargo ||  ||  || Sold to Keith Hollands Shipping Co || Scrapped 1980
|-
| Inyula|| Bulk carrier ||  ||  || Sold to Octamaris Maritime Corporation || Sank in the Black Sea December 1977 in bad weather
|-
| Lake Barrine|| Bulk carrier ||  ||  || Sold to Drillships || Scrapped 1982
|-
| Lake Eyre|| Bulk carrier ||  ||  || Sold to Century Shipping Lines (Hong Kong) || Scrapped 1975
|-
| Nilpina|| General cargo ||  ||  || Sold to Simanggang Sawmill Co || Sank off Little Andaman Island on 22 June 1985.
|-
| Noongah|| General cargo ||  ||  || - || Sank off Smoky Cape in heavy seas with the loss of 21 crew
|-
| Ransdorp|| Tanker ||  ||  || Sold to Dent & Graham || Sank in the Tasman Sea on 18 March 1961
|-
| River Burdekin|| General cargo ||  ||  || Sold to Indonesian government || Scrapped 1971
|-
| River Burnett || General cargo ||  ||  || Sold to Australine Shipping Co || Scrapped 1973
|-
| River Clarence|| General cargo ||  ||  || Sold to World-Wide SS Co || Scrapped 1968
|-
| River Derwent|| General cargo ||  ||  || Interstate Steamships || Ran aground during Typhoon Wanda, refloated and scrapped 1962
|-
| River Fitzroy|| General cargo ||  ||  || Sold to Amakasu Sangyo Kisen K K || Scrapped March 1963
|-
| River Glenelg|| General cargo ||  ||  || Sold to Hang Fung Shipping & Trading Co || Scrapped January 1963
|-
| River Hunter|| General cargo ||  ||  || Sold to Albert Sims || Scrapped 1960
|-
| River Loddon|| General cargo ||  ||  || Sold to Amakasu Sangyo Kisen K K || Scrapped March 1963
|-
| River Mitta|| General cargo ||  ||  || Sold to Hang Fung Shipping & Trading Co || Scrapped 1959
|-
| River Murchison|| General cargo ||  ||  || Sold to Amakasu Sangyo Kisen K K || Scrapped March 1963
|-
| River Murray|| General cargo ||  ||  || Sold to Albert Sims || Scrapped 1959
|- style=white-space:nowrap
| River Murrumbidgee|| General cargo ||  ||  || Sold to Amakasu Sangyo Kisen K K || Scrapped March 1963
|-
| River Norman|| General cargo ||  ||  || Sold to Wallem & Co || Ran aground during Typhoon Wanda, refloated and scrapped 1962
|-
| Talinga|| Bulk carrier ||  ||  || Sold to Elios Compania Navigation || Ran aground during Typhoon Rose, refloated and scrapped 1972
|-
| Timbarra|| Bulk carrier ||  ||  || Sold to Montauk Maritime || Scrapped 1973
|-
| Tyalla|| Bulk carrier ||  ||  || Sold to Cambray Prince Steamship Co || Formerly repair ship HMS Dullisk Cove. Scrapped 1962
|-
| Wangara|| General cargo ||  ||  || Sold to Western Australian Coastal Shipping Commission || Comveryed to a barge 1983
|-
| Windarra|| General cargo ||  ||  || Sold to Collin Navigation Co || Scrapped 1980
|-
| Yanderra|| Bulk carrier ||  ||  || Sold to Collin Navigation Co || Scrapped 1976
|-
| Yarrunga|| Bulk carrier ||  ||  || Sold to Corona Navigation Co || Sank in the Persian Gulf 4 May 1975 after cargo caught fire
|-
| Iranda|| Bulk carrier ||  ||  || Sold to Jollyboat || Scrapped 1982
|-
| North Esk|| General cargo ||  ||  || Sold to West Pacific Shipping || Scrapped 1984
|-
| Lake Boga|| Bulk carrier ||  ||  || Sold to International Activity Shipping & Investment Co || Scrapped 1984
|-
| Lake Boga|| Bulk carrier ||  ||  || Sold to Tien Tai Shipping Co || Scrapped May 1978
|-
| Illowra|| Bulk carrier ||  ||  || Sold to Athenmar Shipping Co || Scrapped 1982
|-
| Lake Illawarra || Bulk carrier ||  ||  || - || Sank after colliding with the Tasman Bridge
|-
| Lake Colac|| General cargo ||  ||  || Sold to Maliac Shipping Corporation || Scrapped 1979
|-
| Lake Macquarie|| Bulk carrier ||  ||  || Sold to Project and Services || Scrapped 1982
|-
| South Esk|| General cargo ||  ||  || Sold to Eastern Shipping Lines || Sank in the South China Sea on 16 February 1980
|-
| Lake Macquarie|| Bulk carrier ||  ||  || Sold to Bluewater Bay Maritime || Scrapped 1981
|-
| Princess of Tasmania || Passenger and roll-on/roll-off ||  ||  || Sold to Bahamarine || Scrapped 2005
|-
| Mount Keira|| Ore carrier ||  ||  || Sold to Agile Shipping Co || Scrapped 1983
|-
| Mount Kembla|| Ore carrier ||  ||  || Sold to Drillships || Scrapped 1988
|-
| Bass Trader (1st) || Roll-on/roll-off ||  ||  || Sold to Halley Enterprise Shipping Co, Panama as Halley || Scrapped 1984
|-
| Merino|| General cargo ||  ||  || Sold to Carpentaria Holdings || Scuttled in the Arafura Sea on 17 December 1986
|-
| Jeparit || General and bulk cargo ||  ||  || Sold to Massis Charity Shipping Co || Scrapped 1993
|-
| Musgrave Range|| Ore carrier ||  ||  || Sold to Zea Shipping Co || Scrapped 1983
|-
| Empress of Australia || Passenger and roll-on/roll-off ||  ||  || Sold to Sun Cruises Maritime || Sank in the Strait of Malacca on 23 August 1992
|-
| Darling River|| Bulk carrier ||  ||  || Sold to Malcome Collins || Scrapped June 1979
|-
| Australian Trader (1st) || Passenger and roll-on/roll-off ||  ||  || Sold to the Royal Australian Navy || Scrapped 2004
|-
| Australian Enterprise (1st) || Container and roll-on/roll-off ||  ||  || - || Scrapped 1986
|-
| Australian Endeavour (1st) || Container ||  ||  || - || Scrapped 1985
|-
| Brisbane Trader|| Container and roll-on/roll-off ||  ||  || Sold to Mastrogiorgis Shipping Co || Scrapped 2010
|-
| Sydney Trader|| Container and roll-on/roll-off ||  ||  || - || Scrapped 1984
|-
| Tolga|| Bulk carrier ||  (leased)||  || Returned to Arctic Shipping Co || Scrapped 1994
|-
| Yarra River|| Bulk carrier ||  ||  || - || Scrapped 1982
|-
| [[MV Townsville Trader|’‘Townsville Trader]]|| Container and roll-on/roll-off ||  ||  || - || Scrapped 1984
|-
| Darwin Trader|| Container and bulk carrier ||  ||  || - || Still in service
|-
| Echuca|| Container ||  ||  || Sold to Wan Hai Steamship Co || Still in service
|-
| Allunga|| Container and roll-on/roll-off ||  ||  || - || Scrapped 1986
|-
| Mount Newman|| Bulk carrier ||  (chartered) ||  || Returned to Pacific Maritime Services || Scrapped 1996
|-
| Alnwick Castle|| Bulk carrier ||  (leased) ||  || Returned to Ben Line || Scrapped 1996
|-
| Tambo River|| Bulk carrier ||  (chartered) ||  || Returned to Northern Bulk Carriers || Scrapped 1998
|-
| MSC Australian Exporter|| Container ||  (leased) ||  || Returned to Mediterranean Shipping Co || Scrapped 1999
|-
| Lysaght Endeavour|| Roll-on/roll-off ||  ||  || - || Scrapped 1987
|-
| Lysaght Enterprise|| Roll-on/roll-off ||  ||  || - || Scrapped February 1987
|-
| Australian Emblem|| Container and roll-on/roll-off || (leased) ||  || Returned to Kawasaki Heavy Industries || Scrapped 1997
|-
| Melbourne Trader|| Roll-on/roll-off ||  ||  || Sold to Bulk Enterprise || Still in service
|-
| MSC Australian Explorer|| Container ||  ||  || - || Scrapped 1986
|-
| Stirling Range|| Bulk carrier ||  ||  || Sold to Antigoni Shipping Co || Sunk 21 November 1983 in the Iran–Iraq War
|-
| Australian Escort|| Container and roll-on/roll-off ||  ||  || - || Renamed Anro Melbourne|-
| Bass Trader (2nd) || Roll-on/roll-off ||  ||  || Sold to Strintzis Lines || Still in service
|-
| Australian Pioneer|| Bulk carrier ||  ||  || Sold to Shanghai Ocean Shipping Co || Still in service
|-
| Australian Prospector|| Bulk carrier ||  ||  || Sold to Trikappa || Scrapped 1999
|-
| Australian Venture|| Container ||  ||  || Sold to Lavicer Investments Corp || Scrapped 2006
|-
| Anro Australia|| Container ||  ||  || Sold to Ruby Enterprises || Scrapped June 1997
|-
| Flinders Range|| Bulk carrier ||  ||  || Sold to China Shipping Group || Still in service
|-
| Australian Purpose|| Bulk carrier ||  ||  || Sold to Lavicer Investments Corp || Scrapped 2006
|-
| Lake Barrine|| Bulk carrier ||  ||  || Sold to Societe Mo Car || Still in service
|-
| Lake Eildon|| Bulk carrier ||  ||  || Sold to Queensland Lime & Cement || Scrapped 2008
|-
| Lake Eyre|| Bulk carrier ||  ||  || Sold to Julia Shipping || Still in service
|-
| Lake Hume|| Bulk carrier ||  ||  || Sold to Clarry Shipping || Still in service
|-
| Australian Progress|| Bulk carrier ||  ||  || Sold to Treasure Sea Shipping || Scrapped 2002
|-
| Selwyn Range|| Bulk carrier ||  ||  || Sold to CSL Pacific || Still in service
|-
| Cape Hawke|| Bulk carrier ||  (leased) ||  || Returned to British Phosphate Commission || Scrapped 1987
|-
| Baron Murray|| Bulk carrier ||  (leased) ||  || Returned to Otway Shipping Co || Scrapped 2003
|-
| Cape Otway|| Bulk carrier ||  (leased) ||  || Returned to British Phosphate Commission || Scrapped 2008
|-
| River Boyne|| Ore carrier ||  || - || - || Still in service
|-
| River Embley|| Ore carrier ||  || - || - || Still in service
|-
| River Yarra|| Ore carrier ||  ||  || Sold to Canada Steamship Lines || Still in service
|- style=white-space:nowrap
| Australian Trader (2nd)|| Container ||  ||  || Sold to Hub Line || Still in service
|-
| Australian Advance|| Container ||  (leased) ||  || Returned to United Arab Shipping Co || Still in service
|-
| Tranztas Trader|| General cargo ||  ||  || Sold to Littleton Services || Sank off Vietnam on 16 December 2010
|-
| Anro Melbourne|| Container and roll-on/roll-off ||  ||  || Sold to Plixia Trading || Scrapped 1998
|-
| Australian Searoad|| Roll-on/roll-off ||  ||  || Returned to Pacific Intercontinental Co || Still in service
|-
| Australian Express|| General cargo ||  (leased) ||  || Returned to Nanyuan Shipping || Still in service
|- style=white-space:nowrap
| Australian Endeavour (2nd) || Container ||  || - || - || Still in service as ANL Australia|-
| Australian Endurance|| Container ||  ||  || Sold to Koala Shipping || Still in service
|- style=white-space:nowrap
| Australian Enterprise (2nd) || Container ||  || - || - || Still in service as ANL Explorer|}

See also
Commonwealth Line, another government-owned shipping company in operation between 1916 and 1928

References
 Ferry to Tasmania'', a short History by Peter Plowman, .

External links
Australian National Line postcard gallery

Bass Strait ferries
Companies based in Melbourne
Container shipping companies
Defunct shipping companies of Australia
Ferry companies of Australia
Former Commonwealth Government-owned companies of Australia
Transport companies established in 1956
1956 establishments in Australia
1998 mergers and acquisitions